First of My Kind is an EP by the English indie rock musician Miles Kane. It was released on 21 April 2012 as a Limited Edition Record Store Day Vinyl, then as a digital download the next day, both in the United Kingdom. The title song peaked at number 65 on the UK Singles Chart. The song premiered on BBC Radio 1 as Zane Lowe's 'Hottest Record In The World' on 14 March 2012. Production on the title track was handled by dubstep pioneer Skream in a move away from his more familiar sound.

Music video
A music video to accompany the release of "First of My Kind" was first released onto YouTube on 11 April 2012 at a total length of three minutes and ten seconds.

Track listing

Chart performance

Release history

References 

2012 EPs
Miles Kane albums